Most Haunted is a British television programme based on investigating purported paranormal activity produced by Antix Productions and was for satellite and cable channels Sky Living/LivingTV. Series 16 and onwards have been aired on the Freeview channel Really. The beginning of series 16 was shown online before other episodes for the series were broadcast on television. The following is a list of episodes and locations for the series since it began in 2002.

During its broadcast on LivingTV, Most Haunted: Midsummer Murders was not counted towards the then existing series count. LivingTV then labelled the 2008 as Series 10 up until their final series which they regarded as series 14. This is reflected in DVD and syndicated streaming releases of those series. Producer and Director Karl Beattie clarified in a Tweet that he considers Midsummer Murders a Most Haunted series and the first series broadcast by Really as Series 16. In the Tweet he refers to the upcoming 2017 series as Series 21. For clarity this list reflects this numbering system. Most Haunted Live! and Most Haunted Extra episodes are not included in this list.

Series overview

Original series

 When Series 12 aired, it was mixed in with an 8 part mini series entitled Most Haunted USA. The 8 episodes in the mini series later became known as Series 13

Revived series
Following a change in the format of Most Haunted before Series 16 began filming, it was decided by the production team to no longer have mediums in the show. As a result, each series produces 10 episodes.

YouTube Channel

Series 1 (2002)

Series 2 (2003)

Celebrity Special (2003)

Series 3 (2003)

Series 4 (2004)

Series 5 (2004-2005)

Series 6 (2005)

Series 7 (2005)

Series 8 (2006)

Series 9 (2007)

Series 10 - Midsummer Murders (2007)

Series 11 (2008)

Series 12 (2008-2009)
Series 12 was broadcast on alternate weeks alongside Most Haunted USA.

Series 13 (Most Haunted USA) (2008-2009)
Most Haunted USA was an eight-part mini-series that aired on the American Travel Channel from 12 December 2008 to 30 January 2009. The series has also aired in the UK on alternate weeks to Series 12.

Series 14 (2009)

Series 15 (2010)

Series 16 (2014)

Series 17 (2015)

Series 18 (2015)

Series 19 (2016)

Series 20 (2017)

Series 21 (2017)

Series 22 (2018)

Series 23 (2018)

Series 24 (2019)

Most Haunted Shorts/Extra (2019–2021)
Most Haunted Shorts is a series that includes episodes that never shown on television. The series has been airs on the Official YouTube channel. In November 2019, Karl Beattie stated "As the Most Haunted Shorts are getting longer, we are now calling them 'Extras'" announcing a brand new Most Haunted Extra to be released the following week.

YouTube Specials

References and notes
Notes

General

Specific

Lists of British non-fiction television series episodes